A melatonergic agent (or drug) is a chemical which functions to directly modulate the melatonin system in the body or brain. Examples include melatonin receptor agonists and melatonin receptor antagonists.

See also
 Adenosinergic
 Adrenergic
 Cannabinoidergic
 Cholinergic
 Dopaminergic
 GABAergic
 Glycinergic
 Histaminergic
 Monoaminergic
 Opioidergic
 Serotonergic

References

 
Neurochemistry